The Federal Bridge Corporation Limited (FBCL) is the name of two successive Canadian federal Crown corporations.

The Federal Bridge Corporation Limited is responsible for operating and managing the following bridges:

 Blue Water Bridge in Point Edward, Ontario
 Seaway International Bridge in Cornwall, Ontario
 Sault Ste. Marie International Bridge in Sault Ste. Marie, Ontario
 Thousand Islands International Bridge in the Thousand Islands

An amalgamated Crown Corporation was formed on February 1, 2015, to operate and manage the bridges operated by the original Federal Bridge Corporation Limited, and the Blue Water Bridge in Point Edward, Ontario (near Sarnia), that had previously been managed under the authority of the Blue Water Bridge Authority.

The company is headquartered in Ottawa, and it reports to the Parliament of Canada through the Minister of Transport.

Bridges
The following bridges are managed by the company, .

Awards and recognition

LEED certification
The Blue Water Bridge Corporate Centre in Point Edward, Ontario, was awarded LEED (Leadership in Energy and Environmental Design) certification on June 25, 2015.  LEED certification is a distinction awarded by the Canada Green Building Council for the design and operation of high-performance green buildings. The Corporate Centre is a four-story building opened in 2011 as an administrative complex for Blue Water Bridge operations.  Its certification plaque is posted in the lobby of the office building in Point Edward.

References

External links
 

Federal departments and agencies of Canada
Canadian federal Crown corporations